Brezovec pri Rogatcu is a settlement west of the town of Rogatec in eastern Slovenia. The area traditionally belonged to the Styria region. It is now included in the Savinja Statistical Region.

Name
The name of the settlement was changed from Brezovec to Brezovec pri Rogatcu in 1953.

Cultural heritage
There is a small chapel-shrine in the settlement that contains a statue of Our Lady of Lourdes. It was built in the early 20th century.

References

External links
Brezovec pri Rogatcu on Geopedia

Populated places in the Municipality of Rogatec